Southwest Hospital and Medical Center was a hospital located in Atlanta, Georgia, United States, and dates its origin to 1943 when Our Lady of Lourdes Catholic Church and the Society of Catholic Medical Missionaries established the Catholic Colored Clinic in response to the lack of adequate medical care in southwest Atlanta. It later became known as the Holy Family Hospital before becoming a secular institution.

Southwest Hospital was a private, not for profit, health care organization. It was a licensed 125-bed acute-care facility, accredited by the Joint Commission. SWH's medical staff includes over 200 physicians specializing in many fields of medicine. The hospital and its physicians participated in numerous managed care and other health insurance plans throughout Metro Atlanta.

The hospital was closed on January 16, 2009, due to credit market conditions. The renovated property was reopened in October 2014 as the Atlanta Center for Medical Research.

References

Hospitals in Atlanta
Defunct hospitals in the United States
Hospitals established in 1943
1943 establishments in Georgia (U.S. state)
Hospitals disestablished in 2009
2009 disestablishments in Georgia (U.S. state)
Historically black hospitals in the United States